This is a list of some (not all) notable writers in the horror fiction genre.

Note that some writers listed below have also written in other genres, especially fantasy and science fiction.

A

B

C

D

E

F

G

H

I

J

K

L

M

N

O

P

Q

R

S

T

V

W

Y

Z

See also
Subgenres:
Body horror
Cthulhu Mythos
Dark fantasy
Erotic horror
Fantastique
Ghost story
Lovecraftian horror
Psychological horror
Splatterpunk
Vampire fiction
Werewolf fiction
Weird fiction
Author lists:
List of fantasy authors
List of Clarion South Writers Workshop Instructors
List of Clarion West Writers Workshop Alumni
List of Clarion West Writers Workshop Instructors
List of Clarion Writers Workshop Alumni
List of Clarion Writers Workshop Instructors
List of notable 20th-century writers
List of science fiction authors
Lists of writers

External links

Horror Writers Association

 
Horror fiction